CRASH: The Live Tour was the seventh headlining concert tour by English singer and songwriter Charli XCX, in support of her fifth studio album Crash (2022). The tour began on 26 March 2022 in Oakland, California, United States, and concluded on 2 March 2023 in Melbourne, Victoria, Australia.

Background

On 4 November 2021, Charli XCX announced the first leg of the tour alongside the album and the release of the single "New Shapes". On 18 February 2022, she announced the opening acts for the tour. Producer and Charli XCX's frequent collaborator A. G. Cook, rapper Baby Tate and synth-pop duo Magdalena Bay opened the North American leg, while the European leg was supported by electronic musician Yeule and pop artist ELIO. On 5 April, Charli XCX announced the second leg of North American tour dates.

Set list
This set list is from the concert on 26 March 2022, in Oakland, California, United States. It is not intended to represent all tour dates.

Act 1
"Lightning"
"Gone"
"Move Me"
"Constant Repeat"
Act 2
"Baby"
"Yuck"
"Every Rule"
"Party 4 U"
"Used to Know Me"
"1999"
"Beg for You"
Act 3
"Crash"
"Boom Clap"
"Boys"
"New Shapes"
"Twice"
Encore
"Vroom Vroom"
"Visions"
"Unlock It"
"Good Ones"

Notes
During the Los Angeles show on 3 April 2022, Charli XCX performed "1999" with Troye Sivan and "Unlock It" with Kim Petras.
During the London show on 19 May 2022, Charli XCX performed "New Shapes" with Caroline Polachek.
During the Paris show on 25 May 2022, Charli XCX performed "Gone" and "New Shapes" with Christine and the Queens.
 During the Primavera Sound Festival on 2 June 2022, Charli XCX performed "Beg For You" with Rina Sawayama. "Every Rule" and "Twice" were not performed.
 During the Orange Warsaw Festival on 3 June 2022, Charli XCX performed "I Love It". "Every Rule" and "Twice" were not performed.
 During the Hurricane Festival on 17 June 2022, Charli XCX performed "I love It". "Every Rule", "Crash", "Twice" and "Visions" were not performed. 
 During the Glastonbury Festival on 26 June 2022, Charli XCX performed "New Shapes" with Caroline Polachek. Charli XCX also performed "I Love It". "Every Rule" and "Twice" were not performed.
 During the Milwakukee Summerfest Festival on 8 July 2022, Charli XCX performed "I Love It", "Spicy", "Hot In It", and "OUT OUT". "Move Me", "Every Rule", "Crash", "New Shapes", "Twice", and "visions" were not performed. 
 During the 80/35 Festival on 9 July 2022, Charli XCX performed "I Love It", "Spicy", "Hot In It" and "OUT OUT". "Every Rule", "Crash" and "Twice" were not performed.
 During the Washington, DC show on 6th August 2022, Charli XCX performed the remixed version of "CHARGER" with ELIO after "visions".
 During the São Paulo, SP show on 9th November 2022, Charli XCX performed "I Got It" with Pabllo Vittar.
 During the Corona Capital Festival on 18 November 2022, Charli XCX performed "I Love It", "Track 10", "HOT IN IT", and "I Got It". "Move Me", "Baby", "Yuck", "Every Rule", "Used to Know Me", "Crash", "New Shapes", "Twice", and "Visions" were not performed

Tour dates

Cancelled shows

Notes

References

2022 concert tours
Charli XCX concert tours